The Epson QX-10 is a microcomputer running CP/M or TPM-III (CP/M-80 compatible) which was introduced in 1983. It was based on a Zilog Z80 microprocessor, running at 4 MHz, provided up to 256 KB of RAM organized in four switchable banks, and included a separate graphics processor chip (µPD7220) manufactured by NEC to provide advanced graphics capabilities. In the USA and Canada, two versions were launched; a basic CP/M configuration with 64 KB RAM and the HASCI configuration with 256 KB RAM and the special HASCI keyboard to be used with the bundled application suite, called Valdocs. TPM-III was used for Valdocs and some copy protected programs like Logo Professor. The European and Japanese versions were CP/M configurations with 256 KB RAM and a graphical Basic interpreter.

The machine had internal extension slots, which could be used for extra serial ports, network cards or third party extensions like an Intel 8088 processor, adding MS-DOS compatibility.

Rising Star Industries was the primary American software vendor for the HASCI QX series.  Their product line included the TPM-II and III operating system, Valdocs, a robust BASIC language implementation, a graphics API library used by a variety of products which initially supported line drawing and fill functions and was later extended to support the QX-16 color boards, Z80 assembler, and low level Zapple machine code monitor which could be invoked from DIP switch setting on the rear of the machine.

QX-11 
The "Abacus" is a IBM PC compatible machine released in 1985 booting MS-DOS 2.11 from 64 KB ROM. It has a Intel 8086-2 CPU at 8 MHz, 128 to 512 KB of RAM and two 3½" floppy drives (360 KB format). The sound chip has 3 sound tones plus one noise channel with 16 independent volume levels, graphics are 640x400 and the joystick ports are Atari-2600 compatible. The was also support for custom ROM cartridges.

QX-16 
Its successor, the dual-processor QX-16, added a 16-bit Intel processor with Color Graphics Adapter enabling it to also boot MS-DOS 2.11. The case of the QX-16 was enlarged to provide enough physical space for an internal hard-drive in contrast to the QX-10's dual-floppy configuration.

Valdocs 

VALuable DOCumentS by Rising Star Industries is a pseudo-GUI WYSIWYG integrated software/OS for document creation and management, written as a set of interactive application and system modules which ran only on Epson's QX-10 and QX-16 computers. A version designed to run on the IBM PC was in development when Rising Star closed in 1986.

Valdocs shipped to beta testers c. late 1982. Beta and initial production releases of Valdocs' application modules were written in the Forth programming language while its system-oriented modules (such as E-Mail and disk utilities) were written in Z-80 Assembly Language. Later releases of Valdocs' applications were written in the C programming language with some modules written in compiled RSI Basic.

The initial release of Valdocs included WYSIWYG word processor and spreadsheet applications (with onscreen fonts, an UNDO key, keyboard macros and multiple screen formats), a cardfile database, an E-Mail/communications module, and a desktop manager with an address book, mailing list manager, notepad, spell checker, ValDraw & ValPaint, calculator and more. The E-Mail program worked in the background allowing mail to be sent by modem to another computer. Valdocs was one of the first environments that allowed users to embed items like spreadsheets and figures in word processing documents.

Chris Rutkowski and Roger Amidon worked on the preliminary QX-10 design; Amidon continued designing software for the QX system after Epson and Rising Star Inc. stopped production. Graphic and other software for the QX-10 and QX-16 were developed by program designers such as Dan Oja and Nelson Donley.

Switching between programs was done by pressing an associated hotkey on the QX-10's keyboard (which was specifically designed to support Valdocs, including an UNDO key) or by selecting a program from a menu the hotkey invoked. The keyboard was referred to as HASCI (Human Application Standard  Computer  Interface) after the user interface with the same name pioneered by Rising Star Industries.

Performance and stability issues
Valdocs on the QX-10 was very slow and buggy. InfoWorlds 1983 review of the QX-10 described the software as "great idea, questionable implementation". It reported that Valdocs on the computer "is slow. Sometimes it merely dawdles slightly, but other times, it crawls. Entering text becomes a disconcerting pastime when the screen display lags as many as 60 characters behind your typing, and you lose characters". The magazine added that "VALDOCS crashed (failed) numerous times while we were using it to write this review. We lost data each time, came close to losing a whole disk, and ended up retyping it into our trusty IBM PC to meet deadline". It advised users to backup their files, but stated that since the process was so slow the computer encouraged them to avoid doing so until it was too late. While praising the QX-10 itself ("Physically this is an excellent machine") and Valdocs' ease of use, Jerry Pournelle wrote in BYTE in August 1983 that "the first problem is obvious from the other side of the room. The Valdocs system is slow. It seems to take forever to do disk operations ... Getting from the beginning to the end of a six-page document takes 15 seconds. Deleting the first three pages of the same document takes 20 seconds". He believed that the software "has pushed the Zilog Z80 chip past its limits ... I don't think Valdocs will ever run properly until something like the 8086 or 68000 is used".

In January 1984 Pournelle reported that version 1.18 "is fast, [but] it's not fast enough for me, my wife, or my assistant. In particular, it is not designed to be used as a substitute for an office machine. It simply takes too darned long to get a business letter out using Valdocs. Just getting the envelope addressed can take a full minute or longer." He reiterated that "the hardware is fine", but wondered if "the industry need yet another Z80 computer for more than $2500" without usable software. Pournelle concluded, "I cannot in good conscience recommend [Valdocs] to anyone who has actual production work to perform. It's just too darned slow." The president of one QX-10 user group complained in April that the word processor was "slow compared to my mother running the mile ... I have four different versions and not one works well". Creative Computings mostly favorable review of the computer and software in June also noted the slow speed of the Valdocs editor, calling it "maddeningly slow in many cases". It noted that the QX-10's 4 MHz processor was not at fault, because other word processors ran as fast as on other 8-bit CP/M computers. Despite Epson's promise of speed improvements, Valdocs 2 remained slow; InfoWorlds 1985 review of the QX-16 reported that the computer was "severely limited by [Valdocs'] slow operation". While the reviewer did not report crashes, a "small but perceptible delay" between pushing a key and the character appearing on the screen when using the word processor grew over time to be "significant and would annoy heavy-duty word processing users", and the spreadsheet was "excruciatingly slow to do just about everything". Pournelle concluded that year that Valdocs "was fatally flawed", noting that Epson advised Valdocs 2 users to share data between the chart maker and word processor with "scissors, tape, and a copy machine".

References

External links
Valdocs Programming Manual contains a chapter on the theory and philosophy of HASCI
Roger Amidon's QX-10 support Page
QX-10 User Manual from Epson
Obsolete Computer Museum Entry
AtariArchives - Test Driving the QX-10
Yet another computer museum
Why someone chose a QX-10 over an IBM PC
Roger Amidon resume, showing the link between TDL, TPM, CDL, QX-10, Rising Star
A Gathering of Magicians, video, CBC television series "Man Alive" about Rising Star at NCC

Personal computers
QX-10
8-bit computers